is an actor and a retired male medley swimmer from Japan, who represented his native country in two consecutive Summer Olympics, starting in 1988. His best Olympic result was the 8th place (4:23.86) in the Men's 400m Individual Medley event at the 1992 Summer Olympics.

Fujimoto started his career as an actor in 1997.

Filmography

Film
Yamato (2005)
Neet Neet Neet (2018)
Hit Me Anyone One More Time (2019), Koga
Rurouni Kenshin: The Beginning (2021), Kondō Isami

Television
Saka no Ue no Kumo (2009–10), Takeo Hirose
Jin (2011), Saigō Takamori
Taira no Kiyomori (2012), Itō Tadakiyo
Hanako to Anne (2014), Soichiro Kajiyama
Sanada Maru (2016), Hotta Sakubei
Segodon (2018), Yamaoka Tesshū
The Fugitive (2020), Toshiya Kondō

References

 sports-reference

External links

1970 births
Living people
Japanese male medley swimmers
Japanese male actors
Olympic swimmers of Japan
Swimmers at the 1988 Summer Olympics
Swimmers at the 1992 Summer Olympics
Sportspeople from Kitakyushu
Asian Games medalists in swimming
Swimmers at the 1990 Asian Games
Asian Games gold medalists for Japan
Asian Games silver medalists for Japan
Medalists at the 1990 Asian Games
Medalists at the 1994 Asian Games
Universiade medalists in swimming
Universiade gold medalists for Japan
Universiade bronze medalists for Japan
Medalists at the 1991 Summer Universiade